Paul Mellia (born 1962) is an established UK  artist and is the only artist officially licensed to reproduce Marvel images.

Born in Edinburgh-Scotland in 1962, Paul began drawing comic book characters at the age of 4. He is dyslexic. He has said, "I couldn't read the stories because the words were jumping around, so it didn't tell me the story. I wanted to draw it to make it look more real to me."

Mellia returned to the UK to establish his studio in London after working in Los Angeles with Disney and Marvel. An exhibition at the Sunset Boulevard Gallery in LA sold out, and Mellia's artwork has sold for prices as high as £59,000.

References

External links
 Paul Mellia's website
 Gallery
 Posing with the 'Heath Ledger' Joker

Living people
1962 births
People with dyslexia